Twywell railway station served the village of Twywell, Northamptonshire, England, from 1866 to 1951 on the Kettering, Thrapston and Huntingdon Railway.

History 
The station was opened on 1 March 1866 by the Kettering, Thrapston and Huntingdon Railway. It closed on 30 July 1951.

References 

Disused railway stations in Northamptonshire
Railway stations in Great Britain opened in 1866
Railway stations in Great Britain closed in 1951
1866 establishments in England
1951 disestablishments in England